Maternidad sin hombres is a 1968 Argentine film.

Cast

External links
 

1968 films
Argentine drama films
1960s Spanish-language films
Films directed by Carlos Rinaldi
1960s Argentine films